Diana of the Crossways is a 1922 British silent drama film directed by Denison Clift and starring Fay Compton, Henry Victor and Joseph Tozer. It is an adaptation of the 1885 novel Diana of the Crossways by George Meredith.

Plot
A sensuous woman trapped in a loveless marriage has an affair with a leading politician which threatens to bring down the government.

Cast
 Fay Compton - Diana 
 Henry Victor - Honourable Percy Dacier 
 Joseph Tozer - Augustus Warwick
 A. Harding Steerman - Tonans 
 J. Fisher White - Lord Dannisburgh 
 Reginald Fox - Tom Rodworth 
 Ivo Dawson - Sir Lukyne Dunstane 
 Ernest A. Dagnall  - Prime Minister 
 Harvey Braban - Rodworth 
 Joyce Gayman - Lady Emma 
 Pamela Cooper - Princess 
 Hope Tilden - May Paynham

References

External links

1922 films
1920s historical drama films
Films directed by Denison Clift
Ideal Film Company films
British historical drama films
Films based on British novels
British silent feature films
British black-and-white films
1922 drama films
1920s English-language films
1920s British films
Silent drama films